Luis Augusto Díaz Mayorca (born August 20, 1983) is a volleyball player from Venezuela, who won the gold medal with the men's national team at the 2003 Pan American Games in Santo Domingo, Dominican Republic. In the final his team defeated Cuba 3–0 (25–23, 25–18, 25–20).

He won with his team the gold medal at the 2005 Bolivarian Games.

He was born in Maracay, Aragua, Venezuela.

Awards

National Team
 2005 Bolivarian Games, -  Gold Medal

References

External links
 FIVB Profile

1983 births
Living people
Venezuelan men's volleyball players
Volleyball players at the 2008 Summer Olympics
Olympic volleyball players of Venezuela
Volleyball players at the 2003 Pan American Games
Volleyball players at the 2007 Pan American Games
Pan American Games gold medalists for Venezuela
Sportspeople from Maracay
Pan American Games medalists in volleyball
Medalists at the 2003 Pan American Games
20th-century Venezuelan people
21st-century Venezuelan people